Stephanie Magiros (born 5 May 1991 in Paddington, New South Wales, Australia) is an Australian snowboarder. She was a participant at the 2014 Winter Olympics in Sochi. Magiros also competes in artistic gymnastics with the hope of becoming the first Australian to make back-to-back Summer and Winter Olympic Games.

References

1991 births
Snowboarders at the 2014 Winter Olympics
Living people
Olympic snowboarders of Australia
Australian female snowboarders
Australian Ninja Warrior contestants
Sportswomen from New South Wales
21st-century Australian women